Kim Beom-soo, also known as Brian Kim, (born 8 March 1966) is a South Korean billionaire businessman, the founder and chairman of Kakao, a South Korean internet company.

Early life and education
Kim grew up in one of Seoul's poorest neighbourhoods and is the third of five children. He was raised by his grandmother in a one-bedroom apartment as his parents worked. His father was a pen factory worker and his mother was a hotel maid with a grade-school education.

He has a BSc degree in engineering, and an MSc degree, both from Seoul National University.

Career
Kim's first job was as a developer for an online communication service at Samsung’s IT services unit.

In 1998, Kim started Hangame with $184,000 he was given by friends and family. The company started as an internet café business but later became South Korea's first online gaming portal. He merged the company with web portal Naver in 2000 and later worked as a representative of NHN until 2007.

Kim moved to Silicon Valley, California in 2005 and in 2006, created IWILAB, an incubator for Korean entrepreneurs in Mountain View.

In 2010, he started KakaoTalk. KakaoTalk is South Korea's biggest messaging app and is installed on 90% of the country's smartphones.

In May 2021, Forbes estimated his net worth at US$11.2 billion.

In the same year, Kim signed the Giving Pledge, committing to donate the majority of his wealth to philanthropy.

Personal life
He is married with two children and lives in Seoul, South Korea.

References

1966 births
Living people
South Korean billionaires
South Korean businesspeople
Seoul National University alumni
People from Seoul
People from South Jeolla Province